Excelsior is a city in Hennepin County, Minnesota, United States. Excelsior's historic commercial district along Water Street is listed on the National Register of Historic Places, and the town has many Victorian-era houses. On Lake Minnetonka's southern shore, the community serves as a local tourism destination for shoppers, boaters, and restaurant-goers. 

Its population was 2,414 as of the 2020 census. Excelsior's major roadway is Minnesota State Highway 7.

History
The first Euro-Americans known to have visited Lake Minnetonka were two teenage boys, Joe Brown and Will Snelling, who canoed up Minnehaha Creek from Fort Saint Anthony in 1822.

Minnesota's territorial governor Alexander Ramsey officially named Lake Minnetonka in 1852. He had been informed that the Dakota called the lake Mní iá Tháŋka (“the-water-they-speak-of-is-large”). The next year, a group of settlers from New York established Excelsior, the lake's first white settlement. 

During the late 19th century, the Excelsior and Lake Minnetonka area was home to several popular summer lake resorts.

Streetcars were used in Excelsior as a part of the Twin City Rapid Transit Company system until 1932, when the line was cut back to Hopkins.

20th century
A large ballroom called "Danceland" (later "Big Reggie's Danceland") stood across the street from Excelsior Amusement Park from the mid-1920s to 1973. Operated by Ray Colihan, it hosted performances by Lawrence Welk, Fred Waring, and the Andrews Sisters in the 1930s. On May 3, 1963, the Beach Boys performed at Danceland. Beach Boys singer Mike Love remembered the performance as a significant moment for the band in a 2019 interview. According to Love, people "were breaking the windows to get into [Danceland] because it was sold out... I said to one of my bandmates: 'This must be like when Elvis was starting out.'" On June 12, 1964, The Rolling Stones played Danceland for an audience of 283. It has been speculated that Excelsior resident Jimmy Hutmaker inspired Mick Jagger to write the 1969 song "You Can't Always Get What You Want" after a chance encounter at a local drugstore earlier that day, but this claim has long been disputed.

In 1974 President Gerald Ford purchased a golden retriever named Liberty from Excelsior resident Avis Friberg.

21st century
Over the years, Excelsior's downtown historic district has been home to many businesses, including hotels, restaurants, and merchants. Since 2010, restaurants and eateries have come to dominate the town's commercial landscape. Excelsior is known for maintaining its historical identity. Beyond the downtown district, it also retains much of its Victorian-era housing stock. Strict building codes are enforced in order to preserve this identity.

The Excelsior Commons and Lake Minnetonka are central amenities to the community and major draws for tourists. The Minnesota Streetcar Museum, a local transportation museum, maintains a heritage streetcar line in Excelsior and operates three restored streetcars on the line: Twin City Lines No. 1239, Winona Power & Light Co. #10, and Duluth Street Railway No. 78.

Geography
Excelsior is in Hennepin County, Minnesota, on Lake Minnetonka's south shore. Minnesota State Highway 7 serves as a main route through the city, leading east-northeast  to Highway 100 in Saint Louis Park and west  to Hutchinson.

Demographics

2010 census

As of the 2010 census, there were 2,188 people, 1,115 households, and 494 families living in the city. The racial makeup of the city was 90.4% White, 2.7% African American, 0.6% Native American, 1.5% Asian, 0.1% Pacific Islander, 2.2% from other races, and 2.5% from two or more races. Hispanic or Latino of any race were 5.9% of the population.

There were 1,115 households, of which 21.0% had children under the age of 18 living with them, 31.7% were married couples living together, 9.1% had a female householder with no husband present, 3.6% had a male householder with no wife present, and 55.7% were non-families. 48.3% of all households were made up of individuals, and 12.2% had someone living alone who was 65 years of age or older. The average household size was 1.92 and the average family size was 2.82.

The median age in the city was 42 years. 19.1% of residents were under the age of 18; 8.1% were between the ages of 18 and 24; 27.4% were from 25 to 44; 30.3% were from 45 to 64; and 15.4% were 65 years of age or older. The gender makeup of the city was 48.4% male and 51.6% female.

2000 census

As of the 2000 census, there were 2,393 people, 1,199 households, and 547 families living in the city. The racial makeup of the city was 94.07% White, 0.75% African American, 0.33% Native American, 2.21% Asian, 1.55% from other races, and 1.09% from two or more races. Hispanic or Latino of any race were 3.13% of the population.

There were 1,199 households, out of which 22.1% had children under the age of 18 living with them, 32.2% were married couples living together, 9.9% had a female householder with no husband present, and 54.3% were non-families. 45.2% of all households were made up of individuals, and 14.1% had someone living alone who was 65 years of age or older. The average household size was 1.95 and the average family size was 2.80.

The median age in the city was 37 years. 19.5% under the age of 18, 10.0% from 18 to 24, 33.3% from 25 to 44, 21.8% from 45 to 64, and 15.3% who were 65 years of age or older. For every 100 females, there were 88.1 males. For every 100 females age 18 and over, there were 85.7 males.

The median income for a household in the city was $43,598, and the median income for a family was $61,406. Males had a median income of $40,845 versus $28,717 for females. The per capita income for the city was $29,127. About 3.6% of families and 5.7% of the population were below the poverty line, including 4.0% of those under age 18 and 5.6% of those age 65 or over.

Politics

Parks and recreation

The Commons and Port of Excelsior is a  municipal park developed in 1854. Other notable recreation areas include Excelsior Parkland and the Lake Minnetonka shoreline.

Since 1935, the Apple Days festival has been held in Excelsior annually to celebrate apple-picking season.

Education

Excelsior is in Independent School District 276, also known as the Minnetonka School District. Newsweek ranked Minnetonka High School 123rd on its list of America's Top High Schools. Niche rated the school the state's best public high school.

The only school Minnetonka Public Schools operates in Excelsior is Excelsior Elementary School. The old Excelsior Public School and Excelsior High School buildings still stand, but are no longer used as schools.

Notable people
John Berkey, science fiction and film poster artist
Jimmy Hutmaker, local celebrity
Haley Kalil, Sports Illustrated Swimsuit Issue model and Miss Minnesota USA
Terry Katzman, music producer and sound engineer
Vinni Lettieri, professional hockey player
Liberty, presidential dog
Ryan McCartan, actor and singer
John Mark Nelson, singer-songwriter
Brent Sass, dog musher
Martha Sheldon, medical missionary
Don Shelby, television personality
Wesley So, chess grandmaster

In popular culture
Excelsior is the setting of Monica Ferris's Needlecraft Mystery book series.

References

External links

 City of Excelsior official website
 Chamber of Commerce

Cities in Minnesota
Cities in Hennepin County, Minnesota
Populated places established in the 1850s